The Watts–Robinson Building (also known as Gaslamp Plaza Suites and the New Watts Building) is an historic building in San Diego's Gaslamp Quarter, in the U.S. state of California. It was completed in 1913.

See also
 List of Gaslamp Quarter historic buildings

References

External links

 

1913 establishments in California
Buildings and structures completed in 1913
Buildings and structures in San Diego
Gaslamp Quarter, San Diego